is a university in Ōta, Tokyo, Japan.

History
The two brothers Yutaka Nukada and Susumu Nukada founded the Imperial Women's Medical College in Ōmori, Tokyo, the location of the present-day Faculty of Medicine, with their own money in 1925 and then established the Imperial Women's Medical and Pharmaceutical College and the Imperial Women's College of Science. They aimed at improving scientific education for women in such fields as medicine, pharmaceutical sciences, and science. After World War II the Faculty of Pharmaceutical Sciences and the Faculty of Science moved to Funabashi, Chiba. With the reform of the Japanese school system in 1950, Toho University became a coeducational institution, focusing on natural sciences, with Faculties of Medicine, Pharmaceutical Sciences and Science.

External links 
 

Private universities and colleges in Japan
Educational institutions established in 1925
Universities and colleges in Tokyo
1925 establishments in Japan